Reggie Northrup (born October 17, 1993) is an American football linebacker for the DC Defenders of the XFL and an MMA fighter. He played college football at Florida State.

Professional football career

Washington Redskins
On May 9, 2016, Northrup was signed to the Washington Redskins as an undrafted free agent. On May 16, he was waived.

Workout with Detroit Lions
On October 9, 2016, Northrup worked out with the Detroit Lions along with Brandon Chubb.

Los Angeles Rams
On December 19, 2016, Northrup was signed to the Los Angeles Rams's practice squad. On January 3, 2017, he was signed to a futures deal. He was waived on June 20, 2017.

Montreal Alouettes
On September 20, 2017, Northrup was signed with the Montreal Alouettes of the Canadian Football League (CFL). In week 15, Northrup made his professional debut and compiled six defensive tackles. He played again in week 18 and made two tackles. In week 19, Northrup had 4 defensive tackles. In his final game in the CFL, week 20, Northrup made 10 defensive tackles and 1 special teams tackle.

Orlando Apollos
In 2019, Northrup joined the Orlando Apollos of the Alliance of American Football (AAF). When the AAF suspended operations in week 8, he finished with 35 solo tackles, 27 assists, 62 total tackles, and 1 sack. He led the league with assists and tied for fifth in total tackles.

Tampa Bay Vipers
In October 2019, Northrup was selected by the Tampa Bay Vipers in the 2020 XFL Draft. Northrup ended up starting 1 of 5 games, and finished with 12 solo tackles, 3 assists, 15 total tackles, and 1 sack. He had his contract terminated when the league suspended operations on April 10, 2020.

Houston Gamblers
Northrup was selected in the 21th round of the 2022 USFL Draft by the Houston Gamblers. He became a free agent when his contract expired on December 31, 2022.

DC Defenders 
On January 1, 2023, Northrup was selected by the DC Defenders in the second round of the 2023 XFL Supplemental Draft.

Mixed Martial Arts career

Amateur career
In December 2020, Northrup made his amateur MMA debut, in which he defeated Mike Anderson by submission in the first round. In March 2021, he fought Josh Mercado in which he won via submission in the third round. In July 2021 he fought Kevin Church, in which he won by knockout. In December 2021, he defeated Darius Kennedy in bare knuckle by knockout in the first round. Northrup's final match was in January 2022, where defeated Jay Mitchell in 35 seconds by knockout.

References 

1993 births
Living people
American football linebackers
Sportspeople from Jacksonville, Florida
Players of American football from Florida
American players of Canadian football
Canadian football linebackers
Mixed martial artists from Florida
Florida State Seminoles football players
Washington Redskins players
Los Angeles Rams players
Montreal Alouettes players
Orlando Apollos players
Tampa Bay Vipers players
Houston Gamblers (2022) players
DC Defenders players